.dev is a top-level domain name operated by Google. It was proposed in ICANN's new generic top-level domain (gTLD) program, and became available to the general public on March 1, 2019, with an early access period that began on February 19. To increase the security of the domains, the entire gTLD has been included in the HSTS preload-list; as a result, popular web browsers will only connect to a .dev webpage using HTTPS.

Security 
The .dev top-level domain is incorporated on the HSTS preload list, requiring HTTPS on all .dev domains without individual HSTS enlistment.

History 
Web developers have been using .dev top-level domains within their internal networks for testing purposes for a long time. However, after Google acquired the TLD, such environments have stopped functioning on some modern web browsers.

See also 
 List of Internet top-level domains

References

External links 
 .dev – ICANNWiki

Generic top-level domains